V-type proton ATPase subunit G 2 is an enzyme that in humans is encoded by the ATP6V1G2 gene.

This gene encodes a component of vacuolar ATPase (V-ATPase), a multisubunit enzyme that mediates acidification of intracellular compartments of eukaryotic cells. V-ATPase dependent acidification is necessary for such intracellular processes as protein sorting, zymogen activation, receptor-mediated endocytosis, and synaptic vesicle proton gradient generation. V-ATPase is composed of a cytosolic V1 domain and a transmembrane V0 domain. The V1 domain consists of three A and three B subunits, two G subunits plus the C, D, E, F, and H subunits. The V1 domain contains the ATP catalytic site. The V0 domain consists of five different subunits: a, c, c', c double prime, and d.

Additional isoforms of many of the V1 and V0 subunit proteins are encoded by multiple genes, or alternatively spliced transcript variants. This encoded protein is one of three V1 domain G subunit proteins. This gene had previous gene symbols of ATP6G and ATP6G2. Alternatively spliced transcript variants encoding different isoforms have been described.

References

External links

Further reading